Sugar Babies are bite-sized, pan-coated, chewy milk caramel sweets which are relatively soft to chew. They are a confection originally developed in 1935 for the James O. Welch Co. by Charles Vaughan (1901-1995), a veteran food chemist and one of the pioneers of pan chocolate, who invented both Junior Mints and Sugar Babies for the James O. Welch Company.  Sugar Babies were named after a song called "Let Me Be Your Sugar Baby".

The company was purchased by Nabisco in 1963. The Welch family of products changed hands a few more times, going from Nabisco to Warner-Lambert (in 1988) then to Tootsie Roll in 1993. Presently, packages of Sugar Babies name Charms LLC of Covington, TN, a subsidiary of Tootsie Roll, as manufacturer.  Welch produced them along with the rest of the Sugar Family (Sugar Daddy and Sugar Mama).

See also
 List of confectionery brands

References

Tootsie Roll Industries brands
Sugar Family candy